"Need One" is a song by British singer Martina Topley-Bird, released as the first single from the album Quixotic. It was released on 2 June 2003 and reached #76 on the UK Singles Chart. There was a music video shot for this song.

Track listings

Commercial release
CD
 "Need One" – 3:58
 "Hours Away" – 4:32
 "Need One" (Fabien's Mix) – 4:20

Promotional releases
Early promo CD-R ("New Mix")
 "Need One" (radio edit) – 3:21
 "Need One" (album version) – 3:55
The promo CD-R is mistakenly called "New Mix", but in fact it features the same radio edit and album version as on the later releases.

1-track promo CD
 "Need One" (radio edit) – 3:24

Promo 12"
A-Side
 "Need One" – 3:50
B-Side
 "Need One" (Riton's Fashion Mix) – 6:13
 "Need One" (Riton's Glitter Mix) – 4:48

Promo CD-R
 "Need One" (Riton's Fashion Mix) – 6:14
 "Need One" (Riton's Glitter Mix) – 4:50

References

External links
 Martina Topley-Bird discography

2003 singles
Trip hop songs
2003 songs
Independiente (record label) singles